Siroch Chatthong (born 8 December 1992), simply known as Pipo, is a Thai professional footballer who plays as a forward or a winger for Thai League 1 club Nakhon Ratchasima and the Thailand national team.

Career statistics

Club

International career
In August 2016, he made his debut for Thailand as a substitute in an away friendly match against Qatar. In the following month, September 2016, he was a substitute again for Thailand replacing Narubadin Weerawatnodom in the 2018 FIFA World Cup qualification (AFC) against Japan at Rajamangala Stadium.

International

International goals

Senior

Honours

Club
Muangthong United
 Thai League Cup (1): 2017
 Mekong Club Championship (1): 2017

PT Prachuap FC
 Thai League Cup (1): 2019

BG Pathum United
Thai League 1 (1): 2020–21

International
Thailand 
 AFF Championship (1): 2016
 King's Cup (1): 2017

References

External links

Siroch Chatthong at Soccerway

1992 births
Living people
Siroch Chatthong
Siroch Chatthong
Siroch Chatthong
Association football forwards
Siroch Chatthong
Siroch Chatthong
Siroch Chatthong
Siroch Chatthong
Siroch Chatthong
Siroch Chatthong
Siroch Chatthong
2019 AFC Asian Cup players